Vaughan John Pascal Broadley (born 4 April 1972) is a former English cricketer.  Broadley was a right-handed batsman who bowled right-arm medium-fast.  He was born at Sutton-in-Ashfield, Nottinghamshire.

Broadley made a single first-class appearance for Nottinghamshire against Derbyshire in the 1991 County Championship.  In this match, he batted once, scoring 6 runs before being dismissed by Dominic Cork.  With the ball he took a single wicket, that of Indian batsman Mohammad Azharuddin.  This wicket came at an overall cost of 111 runs from 32 overs.

References

External links
Pascal Broadley at ESPNcricinfo
Pascal Broadley at CricketArchive

1972 births
Living people
Cricketers from Sutton-in-Ashfield
English cricketers
Nottinghamshire cricketers